is a Japanese economist originally from Kyoto Prefecture. He used to be a professor at Jobu University until 2012.  His current appointments are a visiting professor at SBI Graduate School in Yokohama, Kanagawa, a lecturer at Aoyama Gakuin University, and the Chief Executive Officer of Agora Institute.

Works

Note

External links 
OpenSpectrum Japan
Personal blog of Nobuo Ikeda
Writing by Nobuo Ikeda
Japanese Blogger Today
"Blogs as Formal Objection" - translation of blog post by Nobuo Ikeda
"Economics of the Illegal Download" - translation of blog post by Nobuo Ikeda

Japanese economists
Japanese bloggers
Living people
1953 births
University of Tokyo alumni
Keio University alumni